Mapia is a district of Dogiyai Regency, Central Papua, Indonesia.

As of the 2014 Census, the district has a population of 5,983. It consists of the villages Abaimaida, Abaugi/Obaikagopa, Bomomani, Dawaikunu, Gabaikunu, Gapoya, and Magode.

Populated places in Central Papua